Bacidia is a genus of lichen-forming fungi in the family Ramalinaceae. The genus was circumscribed by Giuseppe De Notaris in 1846. Species in the genus are crust-like lichens with stemless apothecia; they have green algae (chloroccoid) as photobionts. Their asci have 8 colorless, cylindrical to acicular, multiseptate spores, with curved and thread-like conidia.

Species

Bacidia absistens 
Bacidia albogranulosa 
Bacidia alutacea 
Bacidia arceutina 
Bacidia areolata  – Russian Far East
Bacidia beckhausii 
Bacidia biatorina 
Bacidia brigitteae  – Kangaroo Island
Bacidia caesiovirens  – western Europe
Bacidia campbelliae 
Bacidia carneoglauca 
Bacidia chrysocolla 
Bacidia circumspecta 
Bacidia conspicua 
Bacidia convexa 
Bacidia cornea 
Bacidia coruscans 
Bacidia curvispora 
Bacidia cylindrophora 
Bacidia effusa 
Bacidia ekmaniana 
Bacidia elongata  – Russian Far East
Bacidia entocosmensis 
Bacidia entodiaphana 
Bacidia fellhaneroides 
Bacidia fluminensis 
Bacidia fratruelis 
Bacidia friesiana 
Bacidia furfurella 
Bacidia fuscoviridis 
Bacidia gallowayi 
Bacidia granosa 
Bacidia gullahgeechee  – United States
Bacidia heterochroa 
Bacidia herbarum 
Bacidia iberica  – Spain
Bacidia johnstoniae 
Bacidia kekesiana 
Bacidia killiasii 
Bacidia kurilensis  – Russian Far East
Bacidia laurocerasi 
Bacidia leucocarpa 
Bacidia lithophila  – Australia
Bacidia littoralis  – Australia
Bacidia lividofusca 
Bacidia lividonigrans 
Bacidia lobarica  – United States
Bacidia maccarthyi  – Australia
Bacidia macquariensis 
Bacidia macrospora 
Bacidia marina  – Falkland Islands
Bacidia microphyllina 
Bacidia millegrana 
Bacidia modestula 
Bacidia multicarpa 
Bacidia multiseptata 
Bacidia pallida 
Bacidia paramedialis 
Bacidia phyllopsoropsis 
Bacidia placodioides 
Bacidia polychroa 
Bacidia prasinata 
Bacidia pruinata  – Falkland Islands
Bacidia punica 
Bacidia purpurans 
Bacidia pycnidiata  – central Europe
Bacidia quadrilocularis 
Bacidia raffii 
Bacidia rhodocardia 
Bacidia rosella 
Bacidia rosellizans 
Bacidia rubella 
Bacidia rudis 
Bacidia sachalinensis  – Russian Far East
Bacidia schweinitzii 
Bacidia scopulicola 
Bacidia septosior 
Bacidia sigmospora 
Bacidia sipmanii 
Bacidia sorediata 
Bacidia squamellosa 
Bacidia subareolata 
Bacidia subproposita 
Bacidia subturgidula 
Bacidia superbula 
Bacidia superula 
Bacidia surinamensis 
Bacidia termitophila 
Bacidia thiersiana  – United States
Bacidia thyrrenica 
Bacidia vagula 
Bacidia vallatula 
Bacidia veneta 
Bacidia vinicolor 
Bacidia viridescens

References

Gallery

Ramalinaceae
Lichen genera
Lecanorales genera
Taxa named by Giuseppe De Notaris
Taxa described in 1846